Altamura Cemetery in Italy was established in 1942 and is still in use. It replaced the previous cemetery (Altmaura Old Cemetery), which is inside the new cemetery. The area of the old cemetery is called il cimitero vecchio ("The Old Cemetery"). The design of the entrance of Altamura Cemetery was based on the drawings of another design made by engineer Alberto Gennarini in the early years of the 20th century.

Altamura Old Cemetery 

Altamura Old Cemetery, also called il cimitero vecchio ("The Old Cemetery"), was the first cemetery of the city of Altamura and it was built in the 19th century. The cemetery today has been incorporated into the new cemetery, and the previous entrance is now walled and it   has become part of the external walls of the new cemetery. The area of Altamura Old Cemetery (located inside the new cemetery) is called il cimitero vecchio ("the old cemetery").

See also 
 Altamura
 Archivio Biblioteca Museo Civico

References

Bibliography

External links 
 Archivio Biblioteca Museo Civico A.B.M.C. di Altamura

Cemeteries in Italy
Altamura